The Summer of Arcade, known as Winter of Arcade in the southern hemisphere, was an annual feature on Xbox Live Arcade that offered video game titles. , the feature finished its sixth year.

2008
Bionic Commando Rearmed
Braid
Castle Crashers
Galaga Legions
Geometry Wars: Retro Evolved 2

2009
Marvel vs. Capcom 2: New Age of Heroes
Shadow Complex
'Splosion Man
Teenage Mutant Ninja Turtles: Turtles in Time Re-Shelled
Trials HD

2010
Castlevania: Harmony of Despair
Hydro Thunder Hurricane
Lara Croft and the Guardian of Light
LIMBO
Monday Night Combat

2011
Bastion
From Dust
Fruit Ninja Kinect
Insanely Twisted Shadow Planet
Toy Soldiers: Cold War

2012
Deadlight
Dust: An Elysian Tail
Hybrid
Tony Hawk's Pro Skater HD
Wreckateer

2013 
Teenage Mutant Ninja Turtles: Out of the Shadows
Flashback
Brothers: A Tale of Two Sons
Charlie Murder

References

2008 establishments in the United States
Annual events in the United States
Xbox network
Video game events